Arthur Vincent may refer to:
 Arthur Vincent (politician) (1876–1956), Irish politician and barrister
 Arthur Vincent (rugby union) (born 1999), French rugby union player